Anthony Hill (born 9 June 1969 in Australia) is a squash player from Australia. He reached a career-high world ranking of World No. 5 in December 1999.

External links 
 
 

Australian male squash players
1969 births
Living people
20th-century Australian people
21st-century Australian people